Abbotspoort is a town in Lephalale Local Municipality in the Limpopo province of South Africa.

References

Populated places in the Lephalale Local Municipality